Miloš Terzić (born 13 June 1987) is a Serbian volleyball player, a member of the Serbia men's national volleyball team and Romanian club CS Arcada Galați, a bronze medalist of the 2010 World Championship, 2011 European Champion, 2008 Serbian Champion, 2012 French Champion, 2013 Romanian Champion.

Career
In 2010 Serbian men's national team, including Terzić, won bronze medal of the 2010 World Championship. Earlier that year, he won another bronze at 2010 World League. In 2011 he achieved title of European Champion

In 2017 he went to PlusLiga club, Cuprum Lubin.

Sporting achievements

Clubs

National championships
 2007/2008  Serbian Championship, with Crvena Zvezda Belgrad
 2008/2009  Serbian Cup, with Crvena Zvezda Belgrad
 2008/2009  Serbian Championship, with Crvena Zvezda Belgrad
 2009/2010  Serbian Championship, with Crvena Zvezda Belgrad
 2010/2011  Serbian Cup, with Crvena Zvezda Belgrad
 2010/2011  Serbian Championship, with Crvena Zvezda Belgrad
 2011/2012  French Championship, with Tours VB
 2012/2013  Romanian Cup, with Tomis Constanța
 2012/2013  Romanian Championship, with Tomis Constanța

National team
 2009  FIVB World League
 2010  FIVB World League
 2010  FIVB World Championship
 2011  CEV European Championship

References

External links
 FIVB profile

 

1987 births
Living people
Serbian men's volleyball players
European champions for Serbia
Expatriate volleyball players in Poland
Cuprum Lubin players
Serbian expatriate sportspeople in France
Serbian expatriate sportspeople in Romania
Serbian expatriate sportspeople in Poland